The 2012 Pacific Rim Championships were held from March 16–18, 2012, at the Comcast Arena and Comcast Community Ice Rink in Everett, Washington.

Medalists

Artistic gymnastics

Men's events

Women's events

Rhythmic gymnastics

Trampoline gymnastics

Medal count

References 

2012
Pacific Rim Gymnastics Championships